The following is a timeline of the history of the city of Dar es Salaam, Tanzania.

Prior to 20th century

 1862 – Town founded by Majid bin Said of Zanzibar near Mzizima village.
 1872 – Hurricane.
 1887
 Town "taken by Carl Peters for German East Africa Company."
 Lutheran Mission built.
 Catholic diocese of Southern Zanguebar established.
 1891 – Capital of German East Africa relocated to Dar es Salaam from Bagamoyo.
 1893 – Dar es Salaam Botanical Gardens established.
 1894 – Lighthouse built.
 1897 – Ocean Road Hospital built.
 1899 – Deutsch-Ostafrikanische Zeitung (newspaper) begins publication.
 1900 – "Port facilities" built.

20th century

1900s-1950s
 1901 - Lutheran Church built.
 1903 - New Boma (district office) built.
 1905
 Baugesellschaft Daressalam (construction firm) in business.
 St. Joseph's Cathedral consecrated.
 1906 – Kaiserhof (hotel) in business.
 1907 – Morogoro-Dar es Salaam railway built.
 1911 – Post office built.
 1914 – Kigoma-Dar es Salaam railway begins operating.
 1916 – 3 September: Town captured by British forces.
 1919 - Town becomes capital of British Tanganyika Territory.
 1922 – State House built.
 1926 – Legislative Council of Tanzania headquartered in Dar es Salaam.
 1929 – Tanganyika African Association active.
 1930 - Daily News begins publication.
 1931 – Sudanese Association formed.
 1933 - Yacht Club opens.
 1936 - New Wanyamwezi Association founded.
 1938 – Wazaramo Union founded.
 1940 - George V Memorial Museum opens.
 1945 - Township ward council instituted.
 1948 - Population: 69,227.
 1953 – Metropolitan Catholic Archdiocese of Dar-es-Salaam established.
 1954 – Tanganyika African National Union headquartered in Dar es Salaam.

1960s–1990s
 1960 – Population: 74,036.
 1961
 City becomes capital of Tanganyika.
 University College and Alliance Française de Dar es Salaam established.
 1963 – Tanzania Library Services headquartered in city.
 1964
 City becomes capital of the United Republic of Tanganyika and Zanzibar.
 Aga Khan Hospital, Dar es Salaam established.
 1965
 Radio Tanzania Dar es Salaam active.
 Bank of Tanzania headquarters and Kilimanjaro Hotel built.
 Public library opens.
 1966
 Oil refinery begins operating.
 TANU Youth League Centre opens.
 1967 - Aga Khan Mzizima Secondary School built.
 1968 – Tazama oil pipeline begins operating.
 1970 – University of Dar es Salaam established.
 1975
 TAZARA Railway begins operating.
 Population: 517,000.
 1977 – October: Chama Cha Mapinduzi (political party) convenes in city.
 1978 – Mlimani Park Orchestra formed.
 1979 – Airport expanded.
 1985 – Population: 1,046,000 (urban agglomeration).
 1990 – Population: 1,316,000 (urban agglomeration).
 1991 – Mkuki na Nyota publisher in business.
 1992 – "Sustainable Dar es Salaam Program" introduced.
 1993
 Mawingu Studio established.
 Aga Khan Primary School opens.
 1995
 International Medical and Technological University established.
 Doctor's strike.
 Population: 1,668,000 (urban agglomeration).
 1996 – National Assembly of Tanzania relocated from Dar es Salaam to Dodoma.
 1997
 Dar es Salaam Institute of Technology established.
 New Africa Hotel built.
 1998 – 7 August: United States embassy bombing.
 2000
 Fish market built.
 Population: 2,116,000 (urban agglomeration).

21st century

 2001
 April: Political demonstration.
 African Stars Entertainment in business.
 2002 – National Records and Archives Management Department headquartered in city.
 2005 – Population: 2,683,000 (urban agglomeration).
 2006 – Adam Kimbisa becomes mayor.
 2010
 Didas Massaburi becomes mayor.
 May: World Economic Forum on Africa held.
 Population: 3,415,000 (urban agglomeration).
 2011 - December: Flood.
 2012
 October: Muslim-Christian unrest.
 Population: 4,364,541 metro.
 2013 - 29 March: Building collapse on Indira Gandhi Street.
 2018 – Population: 5,147,070 (estimate).
 2021 – Shooting.

See also
 Dar es Salaam history
 List of mayors of Dar es Salaam
 Districts of Dar es Salaam Region
 Timelines of other cities in Tanzania: Zanzibar City
 Timeline of Tanzanian history

References

This article incorporates information from the Italian Wikipedia.

Bibliography

Published in 20th century
 
 
 
 
 
 
 
 
 
 
 
 
 

Published in 21st century

External links

  (Images, etc.)
  (Images, etc.)
  (Images, etc.)
  (Bibliography)
  (Bibliography)
  (Bibliography)
 
 

Timeline
Tanzania history-related lists
Dar es Salaam
Years in Tanzania